Mordellistena tokaraensis is a species of beetle in the genus Mordellistena of the family Mordellidae. It was described by Nanke in 1956.

References

External links
Coleoptera. BugGuide.

Beetles described in 1956
tokaraensis